Fernando Daniel Alves Olivera (born 26 November 1984) is a Uruguayan footballer who plays for Real Estelí in the Nicaraguan Primera División.

Honours
Rentistas
Uruguayan Segunda División: 2010-11

External links

1984 births
Living people
Footballers from Montevideo
Uruguayan footballers
Uruguayan expatriate footballers
C.A. Cerro players
C.A. Rentistas players
Real Estelí F.C. players
Expatriate footballers in Nicaragua
Uruguayan expatriate sportspeople in Nicaragua
Association football midfielders